Swiss Reinsurance Company Ltd, commonly known as Swiss Re, is a reinsurance company based in Zurich, Switzerland. It is one of the world's largest reinsurers, as measured by net premiums written. Swiss Re operates through offices in more than 25 countries and was ranked 118th in Forbes Global 2000 leading companies list in 2016. It was also ranked 313th on the Fortune Global 500 in 2015.

History
On 10–11 May 1861, more than 500 houses went up in flames in the town of Glarus, Switzerland. Two-thirds of the town was reduced to rubble and ashes and around 3,000 inhabitants were made homeless. Like the fire of Hamburg in 1842, which led to the foundation of the first professional reinsurers in Germany.

Swiss Re was the lead insurer of the World Trade Center at the time of the September 11 attacks, which led to an insurance dispute with the owner, Silverstein Properties. In October 2006, the New York appeals court ruled in favor of Swiss Re, stating that the destruction of the twin towers was a single event rather than two, limiting coverage to $3.5 billion.

It acquired the GE Insurance Solutions property/casualty business in 2006, which made Swiss Reinsurance Co. the world's largest reinsurer.

In 2009 Warren Buffett invested $2.6 billion as a part of Swiss Re's equity capital raise after Swiss Re lost 6 billion francs in its financial market operations in the Global Financial Crisis.  Berkshire Hathaway already owns a 3% stake, with rights to own more than 20%.

In May 2016, the Fort McMurray Canadian wildfires caused estimated damages of up to  CAD10 billion, with Swiss Re having the most exposure among reinsurers.

Swiss Re's Admin Re subsidiary began with the acquisition on 1 July 2004 of Life Assurance Holding Corporation in the UK. On 31 October 2008, Swiss Re completed a £762 million acquisition of Barclays PLC's subsidiary Barclays Life Assurance Company Ltd. In June 2014, the company, through Admin Re, acquired the UK pensions business of HSBC Life (UK) Limited worth £4.2 billion. The Admin Re business, which was renamed ReAssure, was eventually sold to Phoenix Group Holdings for £3.2bn in July 2020.

In February 2022, it was announced Swiss Re had acquired Champlain Reinsurance Company (Champlain Re), a Swiss-based run-off reinsurance captive of Alcan Holdings Switzerland AG, a member of Rio Tinto Alcan, in a legacy transaction. Later that month, Swiss Re declared a net profit of US$1.6 billion, in a bounce back from previous losses in 2020. Still, the exposure to COVID-19 in America was excessive; together with increased damages from natural catastrophes, profits were well below the US$1.8 billion estimate. Swiss Re was able to make up for some of its losses due to its increased property business. At the same time, the board of directors assured investors that the company is only minimally exposed to losses during the Ukraine crisis.

Products
The Group consists of the following three business units:
1. Reinsurance
2. Corporate Solutions
3. IptiQ

Leadership
Swiss Re's leadership consists of the Board of Directors, the executive committee and the Group Management Board.

London headquarters
Its London office is located in the 30 St Mary Axe tower, which opened on 25 May 2004. The landmark London skyscraper, designed by architect Norman Foster and popularly known as "the gherkin", was sold in February 2007 for over £600 million (US$1.18 billion) to IVG Immobilien AG of Germany and the Evans Randall property investment firm.

Canadian offices
Swiss Re has two Canadian offices, in Toronto and Vancouver; Swiss Reinsurance Company Canada was named one of Greater Toronto's Top Employers by Mediacorp Canada, Inc., in October 2008, as announced by the Toronto Star.

See also

Geneva Association
European Financial Services Roundtable 
Institute of International Finance 
World Economic Forum

References

Insurance companies of Switzerland
Reinsurance companies
Financial services companies established in 1863
Swiss brands
Companies listed on the SIX Swiss Exchange